Dajabón is a municipality and capital of the Dajabón province in the Dominican Republic, which is located on the northwestern Dominican Republic frontier with Haiti. It is a market town with a population of about 26,000, north of the Cordillera Central mountain range.

Dajabón is located on the Dajabón River, also known as the Massacre River, due to an incident that took place in 1728, in which 30 French Buccaneers were killed by Spanish settlers. The name also became popular after being the site of killings during the Parsley massacre, though the event was not the origin of its name.

History
The city was initially founded between 1771 and 1776, but was soon after abandoned during the War of Independence. It was settled again shortly after the Restoration War in 1865. During the 1822–44 Haitian occupation, the city was officially designated in French as Dahabon.
 
A battle took place at the city between the Spanish and the French in the 17th century. At the time of the battle, the governor of the French colony, Mr. Cussy, was killed in the Battle of the Sabana Real de la Limonada, near modern-day Limonade in northern Haiti.

Population

According to the Population and Housing Census, the municipality has a total population of 25,685, of which 12,644 were men and 13,041 women. The urban population of the municipality was 63.57%. This population data includes the population of the Cañongo municipal district.

The bridge across the river connects Dajabón to the Haitian city of Ouanaminthe. On Mondays and Fridays, Haitians are permitted to temporarily cross the bridge to sell their goods. Most of the goods are used clothes, shoes, bulk dry goods, and housewares; an area of several acres on the western edge of the city becomes a crowded business place. In addition to the Haitians, Dominicans go to the market to sell food (vegetables grown in their country).

Climate
Dajabón has a hot tropical savanna climate (Köppen Aw).

External links
Dajabon, Encyclopædia Britannica

References

Populated places in Dajabón Province
Municipalities of the Dominican Republic
Dominican Republic–Haiti border crossings
Populated places established in the 1770s